Alexander Andrew Russell (born 11 December 1987) is an Australian actor and director. He is known for starring in the films Chronicle  (2012) and Believe Me (2014). Since 2017, Russell has portrayed Jim Street in the CBS crime action-drama series S.W.A.T.

Early life 
Russell was born in Brisbane and grew up in Rockhampton, Queensland. He is the son of surgeon Dr. Andrew Russell and nurse Frances Russell. He has a younger brother, Dominic, and a younger sister, Georgiana. He finished studies at Rockhampton Grammar School in 2004 and afterward attended the National Institute of Dramatic Art (NIDA) in Sydney.

Career
Russell made his debut in the 2010 film Wasted on the Young. In 2011, he appeared in two short films, The Best Man and Halloween Knight. He directed a short film as well, titled Love and Dating in L.A., which was featured on El Rey Network's Peoples Showcase: Horror Edition.

In 2012, Russell starred in Josh Trank's found footage science fiction film Chronicle, which was a critical and commercial success. A year later, he featured in Kimberly Peirce's remake of Stephen King's Carrie as Billy Nolan, a role originated by John Travolta. In 2014, he starred in the independent film Believe Me.

Five years after his TV debut as a guest star on NTSF:SD:SUV, in 2012, Russell joined the main cast of the 2017 reboot of the 1975 series  S.W.A.T. as Officer Jim Street, the role originally played by Robert Urich.

Filmography

Film

Television

References

External links

Living people
Australian male film actors
Australian male television actors
National Institute of Dramatic Art alumni
People from Rockhampton
1987 births
21st-century Australian male actors
Male actors from Queensland